Magnús Einarsson (1092 – September 30, 1148;;) was an Icelandic Catholic clergyman, who became the fourth bishop of Skálholt from 1134 to 1148. He served the diocese of Skálholt. According to Hungrvaka, he intended to build a monastery on Vestmannaeyjar, but died before he could.

References

See also
List of Skálholt bishops

12th-century Roman Catholic bishops in Iceland
1092 births
1148 deaths
12th-century Icelandic people